A serac (from Swiss French sérac) is a block or column of glacial ice, often formed by intersecting crevasses on a glacier. Commonly house-sized or larger, they are dangerous to mountaineers, since they may topple with little warning. Even when stabilized by persistent cold weather, they can be an impediment to glacier travel.

Seracs are found within an icefall, often in large numbers, or on ice faces on the lower edge of a hanging glacier. Notable examples of the overhanging glacier edge type are well-known obstacles on some of the world's highest mountains, including K2 at "The Bottleneck" and Kanchenjunga on the border of India and Nepal. Significant seracs in the Alps are found on the northeast face of Piz Roseg, the north face of the Dent d'Hérens, and the north face of Lyskamm.

Incidents
 On a 1969–1970 Japanese expedition to Mount Everest, Kyak Tsering was killed by a falling serac.
 In 1990, an earthquake caused a block of serac to fall off Lenin Peak, triggering an avalanche which hit a camp, killing 43 people. 
 In the August 2008 K2 disaster, the collapse of large seracs was responsible for at least 8 of the 11 mountaineers' deaths. 
 The April 2014 Mount Everest ice avalanche responsible for the deaths of 16 climbers was caused when a large serac broke off.
 In October 2018, nine climbers from South Korea were killed at Mount Gurja basecamp in Nepal from a gust of wind, driven by falling seracs and snow.
 In July 2022, a serac collapse on the Marmolada Glacier in Italy killed eleven people and injured eight others.

Gallery

See also
 Penitente (snow formation)

References

External links 
 
 

Glaciology